Geraldine Millais Harcourt (25 May 1952 – 21 June 2019) was a New Zealand translator of modern Japanese literature.

Early life and education
Harcourt was born in Auckland on 25 May 1952. She graduated from the University of Auckland, and first went to Japan in 1973.

Career
Harcourt developed a close working relationship with Japanese fiction writer Yūko Tsushima, and translated many of her works into English.  These include:
 Yūko Tsushima, Child of Fortune (1978)
 Yūko Tsushima. Territory of Light (1979)
 Yūko Tsushima, Woman Running in the Mountains (1980)
 Yūko Tsushima, The Shooting Gallery & Other Stories (1973–1984)
 Yūko Tsushima, Of Dogs and Walls (2018)

Works by other Japanese authors translated into English by Harcourt include:
 Shizuko Gō, Requiem (1985)
 Hirotada Ototake, No One's Perfect (1998)
 Yūko Tanaka, The Power of the Weave: The Hidden Meanings of Cloth (2013)
 Takeshi Nakagawa, The Japanese House in Space, Memory, and Language (2006)

Awards
In 1990, Harcourt was awarded the Wheatland Translation Prize. She won the 2018–2019 Lindsley and Masao Miyoshi Translation Prize for her translation of Territory of Light, published by Penguin in 2017.

Death
Harcourt died in Wellington on 21 June 2019.

References

1952 births
2019 deaths
21st-century New Zealand translators
Japanese–English translators
New Zealand expatriates in Japan
University of Auckland alumni
20th-century translators
21st-century translators
People from Auckland
Geraldine